Jean-Claude Flory (born 7 March 1966 in Valence, Drôme) was a member of the National Assembly of France.  He represented the third legislative district of the Ardèche department from 2002 to 2012 as a member of the Union for a Popular Movement.

References

1966 births
Living people
People from Valence, Drôme
Rally for the Republic politicians
Union for a Popular Movement politicians
The Social Right
Deputies of the 12th National Assembly of the French Fifth Republic
Deputies of the 13th National Assembly of the French Fifth Republic
Regional councillors of Auvergne-Rhône-Alpes